Suman Lata Bhagat is an Indian politician and former Minister of Health and Medical Education in the Government of Jammu and Kashmir. She is a leader of Indian National Congress and was elected in the Ranbir Singh Pura constituency for a seat in the Jammu and Kashmir Legislative Assembly.

References

Living people
People from Jammu
Indian National Congress politicians from Jammu and Kashmir
Jammu and Kashmir MLAs 2002–2008
Women in Jammu and Kashmir politics
Year of birth missing (living people)
21st-century Indian women politicians